Piz Avat is a mountain of the Glarus Alps, located north of Sumvitg in the canton of Graubünden. It overlooks the Val Russein on its west side.

References

External links
 Piz Avat on Hikr

Mountains of the Alps
Mountains of Switzerland
Mountains of Graubünden
Two-thousanders of Switzerland
Sumvitg